Häggenås is a locality situated in Östersund Municipality, Jämtland County, Sweden with 320 inhabitants in 2010.

The church was completed in 1837 based upon drawings by builder Lars David  and architect Samuel Enander. An extensive renovation took place in the years 1921-1922

References 

Populated places in Östersund Municipality
Jämtland